Caladenia pendens is a species of flowering plant in the orchid family and is endemic to the south-west of Western Australia. It has a single erect, linear leaf and up to three cream-coloured to dark pinkish-maroon flowers with reddish-purple markings.

Description 
The sepals and petals have long, thin, drooping, thread-like ends. The sides of the labellum have serrated edges or teeth and there are two rows of white, sometimes red-tipped calli along its mid-line. Flowering occurs from August to mid October.

Taxonomy and naming 
Caladenia pendens was first described in 2001 by Stephen Hopper and Andrew Phillip Brown in Nuytsia from specimens collected near Hyden in 1985. The specific epithet (pendens) means "hanging down", referring to the lateral sepals and petals.

In the same journal, Hopper and Brown described two subspecies of C. pendens and the names are accepted by the Australian Plant Census:

Distribution and habitat 
This spider orchid grows in a variety of habitats, including on granite outcrops, near salt lakes and swamps is found from Watheroo and Wongan Hills south to Wagin and Hyden in the Avon Wheatbelt, Esperance Plains, Geraldton Sandplains, Jarrah Forest, Mallee, Swan Coastal Plain and Warren bioregions of south-western Western Australia. Subspecies talbottii is restricted to winter-wet flats between York and Watheroo in the Jarrah Forest bioregion.

Conservation
Caladenia pendens and its two subspecies are classified as "not threatened" by the Western Australian Government Department of Biodiversity, Conservation and Attractions.

References 

pendens
Endemic orchids of Australia
Orchids of Western Australia
Plants described in 2001
Endemic flora of Western Australia
Taxa named by Stephen Hopper
Taxa named by Andrew Phillip Brown